The Miss Universo Italia 2009 pageant was held on May 27, 2009. The winner was Laura Valenti, who went on to represent Italy at Miss Universe 2009, which took place in the Bahamas on August 23, 2009. Valenti did not place in the semis.

Results
Miss Universo Italia 2009 : Laura Valenti
1st Runner Up  : Mirella Sessa
2nd Runner Up  : Anna Gigli Molinari
3rd Runner Up  : Luna Isabella Voce
4th Runner Up  : Fiorella Isoni
5th Runner Up  : Antonella Eyan

References

External links
 http://missuniverse.notizie.alice.it/index.html?pmk=notmuinav

Miss Universo Italia
2009 beauty pageants
2009 in Italy